Henry Parry (1561–1616) was an English bishop.

Life
He was born in Wiltshire, and came as scholar to Corpus Christi College, Oxford in 1576. He graduated M.A. there in 1586.

He was a friend of both Lancelot Andrewes and Richard Hooker, who was Fellow of Corpus with him. With John Churchman he recovered the papers of Hooker, shortly after his death in 1600. He took part in the editorial group who in 1601 met to bring the final volumes of Hooker's Ecclesiastical Polity into their published form.

He was chaplain to Elizabeth I and was present at her deathbed, documented in the diary of John Manningham. A Ming period wucai tea kettle, said to have been given by the Queen to Parry, at a time when porcelain was rare in England, was sold in 2007 for over £1,000,000.

He was Dean of Chester from 1605 to 1607. He was Bishop of Gloucester from 1607 to 1610 and Bishop of Worcester from 1610 to 1616. There is an alabaster effigy of Parry in Worcester Cathedral.

Works
Parry translated the Heidelberg Catechism into English, from the Latin version, with commentary by Zacharias Ursinus. This work appeared as The Summe of Christian Religion, first edition in Oxford in 1587, and often reprinted. In 1610 he translated into Latin The Summe of the Conference betwene John Rainoldes and John Hart (1584), the record of the disputation between John Rainolds and John Hart.

Notes

16th-century English Anglican priests
17th-century Church of England bishops
1561 births
1616 deaths
Bishops of Gloucester
Bishops of Worcester
Deans of Chester
Alumni of Corpus Christi College, Oxford
16th-century English translators
People from Wiltshire
17th-century translators
16th-century Anglican theologians
17th-century Anglican theologians